A cyberneticist or a cybernetician is a person who practices cybernetics.

Heinz von Foerster once told Stuart Umpleby that Norbert Wiener preferred the term "cybernetician" rather than "cyberneticist",  perhaps because Wiener was a mathematician rather than a physicist.

The word "cyberneticist" was used by Nicolas Rashevsky who began as a theoretical physicist. Robert Rosen, who began his career as a mathematician, regarded neurocybernetics—and more generally biocybernetics—as fields closely allied to mathematical biology and mathematical biophysics in which control theory and dynamical system theories also play significant roles.

Today "cybernetician" is preferred by members of the American Society for Cybernetics.

See also 

 Cybernetics
 New Cybernetics
 Mathematical and theoretical biology
 Neurocybernetics
 Biocybernetics
 Systems science
 Systems biology
 Systems engineering

References

External links 

 Noted contributors to cybernetics and systems theory Website by the American Society for Cybernetics.
 Cybernetics and Systems Thinkers overview by the Principia Cybernetica Web.

 
Cybernetics
Mathematical and theoretical biology
Systems science